Those Who Judge is a 1924 American silent drama film directed by Burton L. King and starring Patsy Ruth Miller, Lou Tellegen, and Mary Thurman.

Plot
As described in a film magazine, any romance between Angelique Dean (Miller) and John Dawson (Tellegen) is shattered when she confesses that she has been made the victim of a mock marriage during World War I. Chapman Griswold (Albertson), who knows the facts tries to force her to marry  him, but is prevented, when John learns at the deathbed of Angelique’s deceiver, Major Twilling (Henry), the truth about her noble self sacrifice on behalf of her sister and also that the mock marriage was one in name only.

Cast

References

Bibliography
 Munden, Kenneth White. The American Film Institute Catalog of Motion Pictures Produced in the United States, Part 1. University of California Press, 1997.

External links

1924 films
1924 drama films
1920s English-language films
American silent feature films
Silent American drama films
American black-and-white films
Films directed by Burton L. King
1920s American films